Martínez is a municipality in the province of Ávila, Castile and León, Spain. It had 162 inhabitants in 2010.

References

Municipalities in the Province of Ávila